Mercury(II) chloride (or mercury bichloride, mercury dichloride), historically also known as sulema or corrosive sublimate, is the inorganic chemical compound of mercury and chlorine with the formula HgCl2. It is white crystalline solid and is a laboratory reagent and a molecular compound that is very toxic to humans. Once used as a treatment for syphilis, it is no longer used for medicinal purposes because of mercury toxicity and the availability of superior treatments.

Synthesis
Mercuric chloride is obtained by the action of chlorine on mercury or on mercury(I) chloride.  It can also be produced by the addition of hydrochloric acid to a hot, concentrated solution of mercury(I) compounds such as the nitrate:

Hg2(NO3)2 + 4 HCl →  2 HgCl2 + 2 H2O + 2 NO2

Heating a mixture of solid mercury(II) sulfate and sodium chloride also affords volatile HgCl2, which can be separated by sublimation.

Properties
Mercuric chloride exists not as a salt composed of discrete ions, but rather is composed of linear triatomic molecules, hence its tendency to sublime.  In the crystal, each mercury atom is bonded to two chloride ligands with Hg—Cl distance of 2.38 Å; six more chlorides are more distant at 3.38 Å.

In the presence of chloride ions, it dissolves to give the tetrahedral coordination complex [HgCl4]2−.

Applications
The main application of mercuric chloride is as a catalyst for the conversion of acetylene to vinyl chloride, the precursor to polyvinyl chloride:
C2H2  +  HCl   →   CH2=CHCl
For this application, the mercuric chloride is supported on carbon in concentrations of about 5 weight percent. This technology has been eclipsed by the thermal cracking of 1,2-dichloroethane. Other significant applications of mercuric chloride include its use as a depolarizer in batteries and as a reagent in organic synthesis and analytical chemistry (see below).
It is being used in plant tissue culture for surface sterilisation of explants such as leaf or stem nodes.

As a chemical reagent
Mercuric chloride is occasionally used to form an amalgam with metals, such as aluminium.  Upon treatment with an aqueous solution of mercuric chloride,  aluminium strips quickly become covered by a thin layer of the amalgam. Normally, aluminium is protected by a thin layer of oxide, thus making it inert.  Amalgamated aluminium exhibits a variety of reactions not observed for aluminium itself. For example, amalgamated aluminum reacts with water generating Al(OH)3 and hydrogen gas.   Halocarbons react with amalgamated aluminium in the Barbier reaction. These alkylaluminium compounds are nucleophilic and  can be used in a similar fashion to the Grignard reagent. Amalgamated aluminium is also used as a reducing agent in organic synthesis.  Zinc is also commonly amalgamated using mercuric chloride.

Mercuric chloride is used to remove dithiane groups attached to a carbonyl in an umpolung reaction.  This reaction exploits the high affinity of Hg2+ for anionic sulfur ligands.

Mercuric chloride may be used as a stabilising agent for chemicals and analytical samples. Care must be taken to ensure that detected mercuric chloride does not eclipse the signals of other components in the sample, such as is possible in gas chromatography.

History

Discovery of the mineral acids
Around 900, the authors of the Arabic writings attributed to Jabir ibn Hayyan (Latin: Geber) and the Persian physician and alchemist Abu Bakr al-Razi (Latin: Rhazes) were experimenting with sal ammoniac (ammonium chloride), which when it was distilled together with vitriol (hydrated sulfates of various metals) produced hydrogen chloride. It is possible that in one of his experiments, al-Razi stumbled upon a primitive method to produce hydrochloric acid. However, it appears that in most of these early experiments with chloride salts, the gaseous products were discarded, and hydrogen chloride may have been produced many times before it was discovered that it can be put to chemical use.

This eleventh- or twelfth-century Arabic alchemical text is anonymous in most manuscripts, though some manuscripts attribute it to Hermes Trismegistus, and a few falsely attribute it to Abu Bakr al-Razi.

Historical use in photography
Mercury(II) chloride was used as a photographic intensifier to produce positive pictures in the collodion process of the 1800s. When applied to a negative, the mercury(II) chloride whitens and thickens the image, thereby increasing the opacity of the shadows and creating the illusion of a positive image.

Historical use in preservation
For the preservation of anthropological and biological specimens during the late 19th and early 20th centuries, objects were dipped in or were painted with a "mercuric solution". This was done to prevent the specimens' destruction by moths, mites and mold. Objects in drawers were protected by scattering crystalline mercuric chloride over them.  It finds minor use in tanning, and wood was preserved by kyanizing (soaking in mercuric chloride).  Mercuric chloride was one of the three chemicals used for railroad tie wood treatment between 1830 and 1856 in Europe and the United States.  Limited railroad ties were treated in the United States until there were concerns over lumber shortages in the 1890s.  The process was generally abandoned because mercuric chloride was water-soluble and not effective for the long term, as well as being highly poisonous.  Furthermore, alternative treatment processes, such as copper sulfate, zinc chloride, and ultimately creosote; were found to be less toxic.  Limited kyanizing was used for some railroad ties in the 1890s and early 1900s.

Historic use in medicine
Mercuric chloride was a common over-the-counter disinfectant in the early twentieth century, recommended for everything from fighting measles germs to protecting fur coats and exterminating red ants.
A New York physician, Carlin Philips, wrote in 1913 that "it is one of our most popular and effective household antiseptics", but so corrosive and poisonous that it should only be available by prescription. A group of physicians in Chicago made the same demand later the same month. The product frequently caused accidental poisonings and was used as a suicide method. 

It was used to disinfect wounds by Arab physicians in the Middle Ages. It continued to be used by Arab physicians into the twentieth century, until modern medicine deemed it unsafe for use.

Syphilis was frequently treated with mercuric chloride before the advent of antibiotics. It was inhaled, ingested, injected, and applied topically.   Both mercuric-chloride treatment for syphilis and poisoning during the course of treatment were so common that the latter's symptoms were often confused with those of syphilis.  This use of "salts of white mercury" is referred to in the English-language folk song "The Unfortunate Rake".

Yaws was treated with mercuric chloride (labeled as Corrosive Sublimate) before the advent of antibiotics. It was applied topically to alleviate ulcerative symptoms. Evidence of this is found in Jack London's book The Cruise of the Snark in the chapter entitled "The Amateur M.D."

Historic use in crime and accidental poisonings
In volume V of Alexandre Dumas' Celebrated Crimes, he recounts the history of Antoine François Desrues, who killed a noblewoman, Madame de Lamotte, with "corrosive sublimate".
In 1906, in New York, Richard Tilghman died after mistaking bichloride of mercury tablets for lithium citrate tablets.
In one highly publicized case in 1920, "mercury bichloride" was reported to have caused the death of 25-year-old American silent-film star Olive Thomas. While vacationing in France and staying at the Hôtel Ritz in Paris, she accidentally (or perhaps intentionally) ingested the compound, which had been prescribed to her husband Jack Pickford in liquid topical form to treat his "chronic syphilis". Thomas died five days later.
Mercuric chloride was used by Madge Oberholtzer to commit suicide after she was kidnapped, raped, and tortured by Ku Klux Klan leader D.C. Stephenson. Oberholtzer died from a combination of mercury poisoning and staph infection, the latter caused by Stephenson biting her during the assault.
Ana María Cires, a young wife of Uruguayan writer Horacio Quiroga, committed suicide by poisoning herself. After a violent fight with the writer, she ingested a fatal dose of "sublimado", or Mercury(II) chloride. She endured terrible agony for eight days before dying on December 14, 1915.
Ruth L. Truffant's death was called a suicide after she succumbed to the effects of Bichloride of mercury poisoning on 26 April 1914.

Toxicity

Mercury dichloride is highly toxic compound, both acutely and as a cumulative poison. Its toxicity is due not just to its mercury content but also to its corrosive properties, which can cause serious internal damage, including ulcers to the stomach, mouth, and throat, and corrosive damage to the intestines. Mercuric chloride also tends to accumulate in the kidneys, causing severe corrosive damage which can lead to acute kidney failure. However, mercuric chloride, like all inorganic mercury salts, does not cross the blood–brain barrier as readily as organic mercury, although it is known to be a cumulative poison.

Common side effects of acute mercuric chloride poisoning include burning sensations in the mouth and throat, stomach pain, abdominal discomfort, lethargy, vomiting of blood, corrosive bronchitis, severe irritation to the gastrointestinal tract, and kidney failure. Chronic exposure can lead to symptoms more common with mercury poisoning, such as insomnia, delayed reflexes, excessive salivation, bleeding gums, fatigue, tremors, and dental problems.

Acute exposure to large amounts of mercuric chloride can cause death in as little as 24 hours, usually due to acute kidney failure or damage to the gastrointestinal tract. In other cases, victims of acute exposure have taken up to two weeks to die.

References

External links

 Agency for toxic substances and disease registry. (2001, May 25). Toxicological profile for Mercury. Retrieved on April 17, 2005.
   US National Institutes of Health.  Retrieved 19 July 2022.  Archived 20 July 2022.  
 Young, R.(2004, October 6). Toxicity summary for mercury. The risk assessment information system. Retrieved on April 17, 2005.
ATSDR - ToxFAQs: Mercury
ATSDR - Public Health Statement: Mercury
ATSDR - Medical Management Guidelines (MMGs) for Mercury (Hg)
ATSDR - Toxicological Profile: Mercury

 National Pollutant Inventory - Mercury and compounds Fact Sheet
NIOSH Pocket Guide to Chemical Hazards
  - includes excerpts from research reports.

Mercury(II) compounds
Chlorides
Metal halides
Alchemical substances
Photographic chemicals
Pulmonary agents